Mount Olivet is a home rule-class city in and the county seat of Robertson County, Kentucky, United States, located at the junction of U.S. Route 62 and Kentucky Route 165. The population was 299 at the 2010 United States census.

History
Long before the town of Mount Olivet was created, the Battle of Blue Licks was fought in 1783 between Patriot American frontiersmen and pro-British Loyalist-Indian allies. The decisive result of the battle was a major American defeat at the end of the American Revolutionary War.

Mount Olivet was founded in 1820 and incorporated on December 27, 1851. It became the county seat of Robertson County when the county was formed in 1867. The town was subsequently dissolved, then reincorporated on March 18, 1871, by an act of the Kentucky General Assembly. Mount Olivet was classified as a fifth-class city until 2015, when it was reclassified as a home rule–class city.

In 2014, the city annexed  of unincorporated territory, consisting of the new Robertson County School and the rights of way of U.S. Route 62 and Kentucky Route 616 leading to the school.

Geography
Mount Olivet is located at  (38.531827, -84.037167).

Demographics

As of the census of 2000, there were 289 people, 130 households, and 73 families residing in the city. The racial makeup of the city was 97.92% White, 1.38% from other races, and 0.69% from two or more races. Hispanic or Latino of any race were 1.38% of the population.

There were 130 households, out of which 28.5% had children under the age of 18 living with them, 33.1% were married couples living together, 16.2% had a female householder with no husband present, and 43.8% were non-families. 38.5% of all households were made up of individuals, and 21.5% had someone living alone who was 65 years of age or older. The average household size was 2.22 and the average family size was 2.88.

In the city, the population was spread out, with 26.0% under the age of 18, 8.3% from 18 to 24, 19.7% from 25 to 44, 25.3% from 45 to 64, and 20.8% who were 65 years of age or older. The median age was 40 years. For every 100 females, there were 74.1 males. For every 100 females age 18 and over, there were 75.4 males.

The median income for a household in the city was $18,750, and the median income for a family was $25,625. Males had a median income of $21,667 versus $21,250 for females. The per capita income for the city was $12,172. About 38.4% of families and 37.5% of the population were below the poverty line, including 56.1% of those under the age of eighteen and 23.2% of those 65 or over.

Education
Mount Olivet has a lending library, the Robertson County Public Library.

See also
 Other places named Mount Olivet

References

Cities in Robertson County, Kentucky
County seats in Kentucky
Cities in Kentucky